Oncideres tuberosa is a species of beetle in the family Cerambycidae. It was described by Martins and Galileo in 2006. It is known from Brazil.

References

tuberosa
Beetles described in 2006